Ross McLaren may refer to:
 Ross McLaren (filmmaker) (born 1953), Canadian filmmaker
 Ross McLaren (actor) (born 1991), English actor

See also
Ross MacLaren